The 2020–21 Tennessee State Tigers basketball team represented Tennessee State University in the 2020–21 NCAA Division I men's basketball season. The Tigers, led by third-year head coach Brian Collins, played their home games at the Gentry Complex in Nashville, Tennessee as members of the Ohio Valley Conference.

Previous season
The Tigers finished the 2019–20 season 18–15, 9–9 in OVC play to finish in a tie for fifth place. They defeated Morehead State in the first round of the OVC tournament, before losing in the quarterfinals to Eastern Kentucky. They accepted an invitation to participate in the 2020 CollegeInsider.com Postseason Tournament and were set to host a first-round game. However, the CIT was cancelled amid the COVID-19 pandemic.

Roster

Schedule and results 

|-
!colspan=12 style=| Regular season

|-

Sources

References

Tennessee State Tigers basketball seasons
Tennessee State Tigers
Tennessee State Tigers basketball
Tennessee State Tigers basketball